Nikolay Vasilyevich Nikitin (15 December 1907 – 3 March 1973) was a structural designer and construction engineer of the Soviet Union, best known for his monumental structures.

Biography

Nikolay was born in Tobolsk, Russian Empire to the family of a typographical engineer who later worked as a judicial clerk.  When Nikolay was 17 a snake bite left him with a permanent foot injury.  In 1930, Nikolay graduated from the Tomsk Technological Institute with training in construction.

In 1932, he designed the train station of Novosibirsk.  By 1937, he was living and working in Moscow.  He turned his attention to calculations for the foundation of the monumental Palace of Soviets which was to be constructed at the site of the demolished Cathedral of Christ the Saviour.

In 1957, he was appointed chief designer of Mosproekt-2 - Institute for the Planning of Housing and Civil Engineering Construction in the City of Moscow.  Nikolay died on 3 March 1973 and is buried in Novodevichy Cemetery.

Selected works
Moscow State University's  240 m (787 ft) high main building.  At the time of its construction it was the tallest building in Europe.  Built from 1949 to 1953.
Warsaw Palace of Culture and Science, constructed from 1952 to 1955 also in partnership with Lev Rudnev as main architect.
Luzhniki Stadium 1956.
Colossal 85 meter statue on the Mamayev Kurgan heights overlooking Volgograd, The Motherland Calls, used 7900 tons of concrete and steel in a dramatic sculpture design by Yevgeny Vuchetich.
Ostankino Tower- Completed in 1967, at 540 metres (1772 ft), the highest freestanding structure in Eurasia.

Awards and titles 
Honored Builder of the RSFSR (1970)

Lenin Prize (1970) - for the project of the Ostankino television tower

Stalin Prize of the third degree (1951) - for the development of a long-span shed coating and a method for its removal

External links

Berlinale Delegate for Eastern Europe and CEE film Expert: Nikolaj Nikitin filmneweurope.com, June 13, 2014

Soviet engineers
Structural engineers
Soviet inventors
1907 births
1973 deaths
Tomsk Polytechnic University alumni
People from Tobolsk
Russian civil engineers
Burials at Novodevichy Cemetery
20th-century Russian architects